Alpokalja (English "feet of the Alps") is a geographic region in western Hungary. Its highest point is Írott-kő at 882 metres above sea level. Although there are several lower mountains, the majority of the territory is hilly. Fir forests are characteristic to the region. Alpokalja contains two major but not very extensive mountain ranges: the Kőszeg Mountains and the Sopron Mountains. The Vas Hills and Balfi Hills are also considered part of the territory.

See also
Geography of Hungary
Little Alföld

Mountain ranges of Hungary
Regions of Hungary
Historical regions in the Kingdom of Hungary